Franz Schubert's compositions of 1825 are mostly in the Deutsch catalogue (D) range D 823–862, and include:
 Instrumental works:
 Piano Sonata in C major, D 840
 Piano Sonata in A minor, D 845
 Piano Sonata in D major, D 850
 Vocal music:
 "Ave Maria", D 839, and six other songs from Walter Scott's Lady of the Lake, Op. 52

Table

Legend

List

|-
| 823
| 823
| data-sort-value="063,1826-0" | 63 &84(1826)(1827)
| data-sort-value="0903,019" | IX, 3Nos.20–22
| data-sort-value="712,04" | VII/1,2 No. 4
| Divertissement sur des motifs originaux français
| data-sort-value="key E minor" | E minor
| data-sort-value="1826-06-17" | before17/6/1826–before6/7/1827
| For piano duet; Tempo di Marcia (publ. as Divertissement en Forme d'une Marche brillante et raisonnée Op. 63 in 1826) – Theme and variations (publ. as Andantino varié Op. 84 No. 1 in 1827) – Rondo (publ. as Rondeau brillant Op. 84 No. 2 in 1827)
|-
| 824
| 824
| data-sort-value="061,1826-0" | 61(1826)
| data-sort-value="0903,025" | IX, 3No. 25
| data-sort-value="714,09" | VII/1, 4
| data-sort-value="Polonaises, 6" | Six Polonaises
| data-sort-value="key I" | Various keys
| data-sort-value="1826-04-01" | April 1826
| For piano duet
|-
| data-sort-value="825" | 825No. 1
| 825
| data-sort-value="064,1828-1" | 64,1(1828)
| data-sort-value="1600,024" | XVINo. 24
| data-sort-value="304,52" | III, 4No. 52
| Wehmut, D 825
| data-sort-value="text Die Abendglocke tonet" | Die Abendglocke tönet
| data-sort-value="1826-06-20" | beforesummer 1826
|-
| data-sort-value="825A" | 825No. 2
| 825A
| data-sort-value="064,1828-2" | 64,2(1828)
| data-sort-value="1600,025" | XVINo. 25
| data-sort-value="304,53" | III, 4No. 53
| Ewige Liebe
| data-sort-value="text Ertonet, ihr Saiten, in nachtlicher Ruh" | Ertönet, ihr Saiten, in nächtlicher Ruh
| data-sort-value="1826-06-20" | beforesummer 1826
| data-sort-value="Text by Schulze, Ernst, Ertonet, ihr Saiten, in nachtlicher Ruh" | Text by Schulze; For ttbb
|-
| data-sort-value="825B" | 825No. 3
| 825B
| data-sort-value="064,1828-3" | 64,3(1828)
| data-sort-value="1600,026" | XVINo. 26
| data-sort-value="304,54" | III, 4No. 54
| Flucht
| data-sort-value="text In der Freie will ich leben" | In der Freie will ich leben
| data-sort-value="1825-01-01" | early 1825
|-
| 826
| 826
| data-sort-value="XXX,1892" | (1892)
| data-sort-value="1700,014" | XVIINo. 14
| data-sort-value="302,17" | III, 2aNo. 17
| data-sort-value="Tanz, Der" | Der Tanz
| data-sort-value="text Es redet und traumet die Jugend so viel" | Es redet und träumet die Jugend so viel
| data-sort-value="1828-01-01" | early 1828
| data-sort-value="Text by Schnitzer von Meerau, Kolumban, Es redet und träumet die Jugend so viel" | Text by ?; For satb and piano
|-
| 827
| 827
| data-sort-value="043,1825-2" | 43,2(1825)(1975)
| data-sort-value="2008,470" | XX, 8No. 470
| data-sort-value="402,0432" | IV, 2a &b No. 10
| data-sort-value="Nacht und Traume" | Nacht und Träume
| data-sort-value="text Heil'ge Nacht, du sinkest nieder!" | Heil'ge Nacht, du sinkest nieder!
| data-sort-value="1823-05-31" | beforeJune 1823
| data-sort-value="Text by Collin, Matthaus Casimir von, Heil'ge Nacht, du sinkest nieder!" | Text by Collin, M. C.; Two versions: 2nd, in AGA, is Op. 43 No. 2
|-
| 828
| 828
| data-sort-value="043,1825-1" | 43,1(1825)
| data-sort-value="2008,469" | XX, 8No. 469
| data-sort-value="402,0431" | IV, 2a
| data-sort-value="Junge Nonne, Die" | Die junge Nonne
| data-sort-value="text Wie braust durch die Wipfel" | Wie braust durch die Wipfel
| data-sort-value="1825-01-01" | early 1825
| data-sort-value="Text by Craigher de Jachelutta, Jacob Nikolaus, Wie braust durch die Wipfel"| Text by 
|-
| 829
| 829
| data-sort-value="XXX,1873" | (1873)
| data-sort-value="2010,603" | XX, 10No. 603
| data-sort-value="413,00" | IV, 13
| Abschied, D 829, a.k.a. Abschied von der Erde
| data-sort-value="text Leb' wohl du schone Erde" | Leb' wohl du schöne Erde
| data-sort-value="1826-02-17" | before17/2/1826
|-
| 830
| 830
| data-sort-value="085,1828-1" | 85,1(1828)
| data-sort-value="2009,541" | XX, 9No. 541
| data-sort-value="404,00" | IV, 4
| Lied der Anne Lyle
| data-sort-value="text Warst du bei mir im Lebenstal" | Wärst du bei mir im Lebenstal
| data-sort-value="1825-01-01" | early 1825?
| data-sort-value="Text by Macdonald, Andrew quoted in Scott, Walter" | Text by Macdonald quoted in Scott's Montrose (transl.)
|-
| 831
| 831
| data-sort-value="085,1828-2" | 85,2(1828)
| data-sort-value="2009,542" | XX, 9No. 542
| data-sort-value="404,00" | IV, 4
| Gesang der Norna
| data-sort-value="text Mich fuhrt mein Weg wohl meilenlang" | Mich führt mein Weg wohl meilenlang
| data-sort-value="1825-01-01" | early 1825
| data-sort-value="Text by Scott, Walter from The Pirate" | Text by Scott from The Pirate transl. by 
|-
| 832
| 832
| data-sort-value="XXX,1830" | (1830)
| data-sort-value="2008,466" | XX, 8No. 466
| data-sort-value="413,00" | IV, 13
| data-sort-value="Sangers Habe, Des" | Des Sängers Habe
| data-sort-value="text Schlagt mein ganzes Gluck in Splitter" | Schlagt mein ganzes Glück in Splitter
| data-sort-value="1825-02-01" | February1825
| data-sort-value="Text by Schlechta, Franz Xaver von, Schlagt mein ganzes Gluck in Splitter"| Text by 
|-
| 833
| 833
| data-sort-value="101,1827-2" | 101p,2(1827)(1895)
| data-sort-value="2008,468" | XX, 8No. 468
| data-sort-value="405,00" | IV, 5
| data-sort-value="Blinde Knabe, Der" | Der blinde Knabe
| data-sort-value="text O sagt, ihr Lieben, mir einmal" | O sagt, ihr Lieben, mir einmal
| data-sort-value="1825-04-01" | April 1825
|-
| 834
| 834
| data-sort-value="093,1828-1" | 93,1(1828)(1835)
| data-sort-value="2008,476" | XX, 8No. 476
| data-sort-value="405,00" | IV, 5
| Im Walde, D 834
| data-sort-value="text Ich wandre uber Berg und Tal" | Ich wandre über Berg und Tal
| data-sort-value="1827-09-01" | March 1825–Sep. 1827
| data-sort-value="Text by Schulze, Ernst, Ich wandre uber Berg und Tal" | Text by Schulze; Two versions: 2nd, publ. 1828, in AGA
|-
| 835
| 835
| data-sort-value="052,1826-3" | 52,3(1826)
| data-sort-value="1600,010" | XVINo. 10
| data-sort-value="303,33" | III, 3 No. 33IV, 3
| Bootgesang a.k.a. Boat Song
| data-sort-value="text Triumph, er naht" | Triumph, er naht (Hail to the chief)
| data-sort-value="1825-01-01" | 1825
|-
| 836
| 836
| data-sort-value="052,1826-4" | 52,4(1826)
| data-sort-value="1800,001" | XVIIINo. 1
| data-sort-value="303,09" | III, 3 No. 9IV, 3
| Coronach: Totengesang der Frauen und Mädchen
| data-sort-value="text Er ist uns geschieden" | Er ist uns geschieden (He is gone to the mountain)
| data-sort-value="1825-01-01" | 1825
|-
| 837
| 837
| data-sort-value="052,1826-1" | 52,1(1826)
| data-sort-value="2008,471" | XX, 8No. 471
| data-sort-value="403,00" | IV, 3
| Ellens Gesang I a.k.a. Ellen's Song (I)
| data-sort-value="text Raste, Krieger, Krieg ist aus" | Raste, Krieger, Krieg ist aus (Soldier rest! thy warfare o'er)
| data-sort-value="1825-04-01" | April–July 1825
|-
| 838
| 838
| data-sort-value="052,1826-2" | 52,2(1826)
| data-sort-value="2008,472" | XX, 8No. 472
| data-sort-value="403,00" | IV, 3
| Ellens Gesang II a.k.a. Ellen's Song (II)
| data-sort-value="text Jager, ruhe von der Jagd!" | Jäger, ruhe von der Jagd! (Huntsman rest! thy chase is done)
| data-sort-value="1825-04-01" | April–July 1825
|-
| 839
| 839
| data-sort-value="052,1826-6" | 52,6(1826)
| data-sort-value="2008,474" | XX, 8No. 474
| data-sort-value="403,00" | IV, 3
| Ave Maria a.k.a. Ellens Gesang III: Hymne an die Jungfrau
| data-sort-value="text Ave Maria! Jungfrau mild" | Ave Maria! Jungfrau mild (Ave Maria! maiden mild)
| data-sort-value="1825-04-01" | April 1825
|-
| 840
| 840
| data-sort-value="XXX,1839" | (1839)(1861)
| data-sort-value="2103,014" | XXI, 3No. 14
| data-sort-value="722,04" | VII/2, 2No. 13
| Piano Sonata, D 840 ("Reliquie")
| data-sort-value="key C major" | C major
| data-sort-value="1825-04-01" | April 1825
| Moderato – Andante (publ. 1839) – Minuet (fragment) – Rondo (fragment)
|-
| 841
| 841
| data-sort-value="XXX,1930" | (1930)
| data-sort-value="ZZZZ" |
| data-sort-value="726,00" | VII/2, 6
| data-sort-value="German Dances, 02, D 841" | Two German Dances, D 841
| data-sort-value="key I" | Various keys
| data-sort-value="1825-04-01" | April 1825
| For piano
|-
| 842
| 842
| data-sort-value="XXX,1833" | (1833)
| data-sort-value="2008,467" | XX, 8No. 467
| data-sort-value="413,00" | IV, 13
| data-sort-value="Totengrabers Heimwehe" | Totengräbers Heimwehe
| data-sort-value="text O Menschheit, o Leben, was soll's?" | O Menschheit, o Leben, was soll's?
| data-sort-value="1825-04-01" | April 1825
| data-sort-value="Text by Craigher de Jachelutta, Jacob Nikolaus, O Menschheit, o Leben, was soll's?"| Text by 
|-
| 843
| 843
| data-sort-value="052,1826-7" | 52,7(1826)
| data-sort-value="2008,475" | XX, 8No. 475
| data-sort-value="403,00" | IV, 3
| data-sort-value="Lied des gefangenen Jagers" | Lied des gefangenen Jägers – Lay of the Imprisoned Huntsman
| data-sort-value="text Mein Ross so mud" | Mein Roß so müd – My hawk is tired
| data-sort-value="1825-04-01" | April 1825
|-
| 844
| 844
| data-sort-value="XXX,1897" | (1897)
| data-sort-value="2103,031" | XXI, 3No. 31
| data-sort-value="726,00" | VII/2, 6
| Waltz, D 844, a.k.a. Albumblatt
| data-sort-value="key G major" | G major
| data-sort-value="1825-04-16" | 16/4/1825
| For piano
|-
| 845
| 845
| data-sort-value="042,1826-0" | 42(1826)
| data-sort-value="1000,009" | X No. 9
| data-sort-value="722,05" | VII/2, 2No. 14
| Piano Sonata, D 845
| data-sort-value="key A minor" | A minor
| data-sort-value="1825-05-19" | before endMay 1825
| Moderato – Andante – Scherzo – Rondo
|-
| 846
| 846
| data-sort-value="052,1826-5" | 52,5(1826)
| data-sort-value="2008,473" | XX, 8No. 473
| data-sort-value="403,00" | IV, 3
| Normans Gesang
| data-sort-value="text Die Nacht bricht bald herein" | Die Nacht bricht bald herein
| data-sort-value="1825-04-01" | April 1825
|-
| 847
| 847
| data-sort-value="155,1849-0" | 155p(1849)
| data-sort-value="1600,029" | XVINo. 29
| data-sort-value="304,55" | III, 4No. 55
| Trinklied aus dem 16. Jahrhundert
| data-sort-value="text Edit Nonna, edit Clerus" | Edit Nonna, edit Clerus
| data-sort-value="1825-07-01" | July 1825
| data-sort-value="Text by Graffer, Franz, Edit Nonna, edit Clerus"| Text by Gräffer; For ttbb
|-
| 848
| 848
| data-sort-value="156,1849-0" | 156p(1849)
| data-sort-value="1600,030" | XVINo. 30
| data-sort-value="304,56" | III, 4No. 56
| Nachtmusik
| data-sort-value="text Wir stimmen dir mit Flotensang" | Wir stimmen dir mit Flötensang
| data-sort-value="1825-07-01" | July 1825
| data-sort-value="Text by Seckendorff, Karl Siegmund von, Wir stimmen dir mit Flotensang"| Text by Seckendorff; For ttbb
|-
| 849
| data-sort-value="999.0944" | 944
| data-sort-value="ZZZZ" |
| data-sort-value="ZZZZ" |
| data-sort-value="ZZZZ" |
| Gmunden-Gastein Symphony
| data-sort-value="key C major" | C major
| data-sort-value="1825-09-01" | Jun.–Sep.1825
|-
| 850
| 850
| data-sort-value="053,1826-0" | 53(1826)
| data-sort-value="1000,011" | X No. 11
| data-sort-value="722,06" | VII/2, 2No. 15
| Piano Sonata, D 850 ("Gasteiner")
| data-sort-value="key D major" | D major
| data-sort-value="1825-08-01" | August 1825
| Allegro vivace – Con moto – Scherzo – Rondo
|-
| 851
| 851
| data-sort-value="079,1827-1" | 79,1(1827)(1895)
| data-sort-value="2008,478" | XX, 8No. 478
| data-sort-value="403,00" | IV, 3
| data-sort-value="Heimweh, Das, D 851" | Das Heimweh, D 851
| data-sort-value="text Ach, der Gebirgssohn" | Ach, der Gebirgssohn
| data-sort-value="1825-08-01" | August 1825
| data-sort-value="Text by Pyrker, Ladislaus, Ach, der Gebirgssohn"| Text by Pyrker; Two versions: 2nd is Op. 79 No. 1
|-
| 852
| 852
| data-sort-value="079,1827-2" | 79,2(1827)
| data-sort-value="2008,479" | XX, 8No. 479
| data-sort-value="403,00" | IV, 3
| data-sort-value="Allmacht, Die, D 852" | Die Allmacht, D 852
| data-sort-value="text Gross ist Jehova, der Herr! 1" | Groß ist Jehova, der Herr!
| data-sort-value="1825-08-01" | August 1825
| data-sort-value="Text by Pyrker, Ladislaus, Gross ist Jehova, der Herr! 1"| Text by Pyrker; Two versions: 2nd, in AGA, is Op. 79 No. 2
|-
| 853
| 853
| data-sort-value="093,1828-2" | 93,2(1828)(1835)
| data-sort-value="2008,477" | XX, 8No. 477
| data-sort-value="405,00" | IV, 5
| Auf der Bruck
| data-sort-value="text Frisch trabe sonder Ruh' und Rast" | Frisch trabe sonder Ruh' und Rast
| data-sort-value="1827-09-01" | Mar. or Aug.1825–Sep. 1827
| data-sort-value="Text by Schulze, Ernst, Frisch trabe sonder Ruh' und Rast" | Text by Schulze; Two versions: 2nd, publ. 1828, in AGA
|-
| 854
| 854
| data-sort-value="XXX,1830" | (1830)
| data-sort-value="2008,480" | XX, 8No. 480
| data-sort-value="413,00" | IV, 13
| data-sort-value="Fulle der Liebe" | Fülle der Liebe
| data-sort-value="text Ein sehnend Streben teilt mir das Herz" | Ein sehnend Streben teilt mir das Herz
| data-sort-value="1825-08-01" | August 1825
| data-sort-value="Text by Schlegel, Friedrich von, Ein sehnend Streben teilt mir das Herz" | Text by Schlegel, F.
|-
| 855
| 855
| data-sort-value="XXX,1842" | (1842)
| data-sort-value="2008,481" | XX, 8No. 481
| data-sort-value="413,00" | IV, 13
| Wiedersehn
| data-sort-value="text Der Fruhlingssonne holdes Lacheln" | Der Frühlingssonne holdes Lächeln
| data-sort-value="1825-09-01" | September1825
| data-sort-value="Text by Schlegel, August Wilhelm, Der Fruhlingssonne holdes Lacheln" | Text by Schlegel, A. W.
|-
| 856
| 856
| data-sort-value="088,1827-1" | 88,1(1827)
| data-sort-value="2008,482" | XX, 8No. 482
| data-sort-value="404,00" | IV, 4
| data-sort-value="Abendlied fur die Entfernte" | Abendlied für die Entfernte
| data-sort-value="text Hinaus mein Blick, hinaus ins Tal" | Hinaus mein Blick, hinaus ins Tal
| data-sort-value="1825-09-01" | September1825
| data-sort-value="Text by Schlegel, August Wilhelm, Hinaus mein Blick, hinaus ins Tal" | Text by Schlegel, A. W.
|-
| 857
| 857
| data-sort-value="124,1829-0" | 124p(1829)
| data-sort-value="2008,483" | XX, 8Nos.483–484
| data-sort-value="413,00" | IV, 13
| data-sort-value="Lacrimas, 2 scenes from" | Two scenes from Lacrimas: 1. Lied der Delphine – 2. Lied des Florio
| data-sort-value="text Ach, was soll ich beginnen vor Liebe?" | 1. Ach, was soll ich beginnen vor Liebe? – 2. Nun, da Schatten niedergleiten
| data-sort-value="1825-09-01" | September1825
| data-sort-value="Text by Schutz, Wilhelm von from Lacrimas" | Text by Schütz
|-
| 859
| 859
| data-sort-value="055,1826-0" | 55(1826)
| data-sort-value="0901,004" | IX, 1No. 4
| data-sort-value="714,04" | VII/1, 4
| data-sort-value="Grande Marche Funebre" | Grande Marche Funèbre
| data-sort-value="key C minor" | C minor
| data-sort-value="1825-12-02" | after1/12/1825
| For piano duet
|-
| 860
| 860
| data-sort-value="XXX,1832" | (1832)
| data-sort-value="2008,485" | XX, 8No. 485
| data-sort-value="413,00" | IV, 13
| An mein Herz
| data-sort-value="text O Herz, sei endlich stille" | O Herz, sei endlich stille
| data-sort-value="1825-12-01" | December1825
| data-sort-value="Text by Schulze, Ernst, O Herz, sei endlich stille" | Text by Schulze
|-
| 861
| 861
| data-sort-value="XXX,1832" | (1832)
| data-sort-value="2008,486" | XX, 8No. 486
| data-sort-value="413,00" | IV, 13
| data-sort-value="Liebliche Stern, Der" | Der liebliche Stern
| data-sort-value="text Ihr Sternlein, still in der Hohe" | Ihr Sternlein, still in der Höhe
| data-sort-value="1825-12-01" | December1825
| data-sort-value="Text by Schulze, Ernst, Ihr Sternlein, still in der Hohe" | Text by Schulze
|-
| 862
| 862
| data-sort-value="088,1827-3" | 88,3(1827)
| data-sort-value="2008,499" | XX, 8No. 499
| data-sort-value="404,00" | IV, 4
| Um Mitternacht
| data-sort-value="text Keine Stimme hor' ich schallen" | Keine Stimme hör' ich schallen
| data-sort-value="1826-03-01" | Dec. 1825–Mar. 1826?
| data-sort-value="Text by Schulze, Ernst, Keine Stimme hor' ich schallen" | Text by Schulze; Two versions: 2nd is Op. 88 No. 3
|}

Lists of compositions by Franz Schubert
Compositions by Franz Schubert
Schubert